Joseline's Cabaret is a reality television series, starring Joseline Hernandez. It premiered on January 19, 2020 on Zeus Network in partnership with The Shade Room.

Development
On June 1, 2017, Joseline Hernandez quit Love & Hip Hop: Atlanta after six seasons, amid tensions with creator Mona Scott-Young and the show's producers. On January 8, 2018, it was reported that Hernandez had signed a deal with We TV to star in her own docu-series, produced by Carlos King. The project, then titled Joseline Takes Miami, initially began filming in July 2018. On March 4, 2019, it was reported that production on Joseline Takes Miami had been stalled and that the network was requesting reshoots.

On October 11, 2019, it was announced that Joseline had signed a deal with Zeus Network, a subscription-based influencer-driven streaming service, to star and produce her own projects. On October 22, 2019, Zeus released a teaser of Joseline's Cabaret. On December 18, 2019, Zeus released an official trailer. On January 10, 2020, it was announced that Joseline's Cabaret: Miami, the first incarnation of a planned reality television franchise, would premiere January 19, 2020. Joseline's Cabaret: Miami would be one of three shows featuring Joseline to air simultaneously throughout January and February 2020, she would also appear VH1's Love & Hip Hop: Miami and We TV's Marriage Boot Camp: Hip Hop Edition.

On February 8, 2020, Joseline announced that season two of Joseline's Cabaret would be filmed in Atlanta. On September 21, 2020, Zeus confirmed that they had renewed the series. The show's second incarnation, Joseline's Cabaret: Atlanta, premiered on April 18, 2021. On December 10, 2020, We TV announced they are acquired the television rights to both Joseline's Cabaret: Miami and The Real Blac Chyna, which aired from April 15, 2021, albeit in censored form.

On March 2, 2021, Joseline confirmed that the third season will be filmed in Las Vegas. On December 20, 2021, Zeus announced that the show's third incarnation, Joseline's Cabaret: Las Vegas, which premiered on January 16, 2022.

Series synopsis

Overview and casting
Joseline's Cabaret: Miami chronicles the everyday life of Joseline Hernandez as she struggles to launch a cabaret show in Miami, Florida. The show is set in G5ive Miami, a strip club where Joseline worked a decade ago, and provides an inside look into the every day lives of strippers and sex workers, reminiscent of the 1998 film The Players Club. The dancers featured in the cabaret appear as supporting cast members in confessional interview segments throughout the series. They include Daisy (Seanyce Bishop), Joseline's friend and self-professed "bottom bitch", as well as dancers Ms. JaaDreams (Coriana Singleton), Lucky Hustla (Nieja Howell), Chazzity Leslie and Sapphire Eden (Tierra Williams). The show also features interludes with original music by Joseline and her fiancé Balistic Beats (Robin Ingouma), who is credited as the show's music producer.

Joseline's Cabaret: Atlanta is set in a mansion in Atlanta, Georgia, and chronicles Joseline's second attempt to launch a cabaret show. The show introduces a reality competition element, with ten girls living together in the mansion with Joseline and Balistic; the top four dancers are cast in the cabaret performance, with an overall winner given a cash prize of $10,000 and the opportunity to perform the cabaret in Vegas. Lucky and Sapphire return, along with eight new cast members who previously appeared in Joseline's Cabaret: Auditions. They include Blue Face Barbie (Lauren Woods) from Miami, Aqua (Kasie McCalvin) from Detroit, Lexi Blow from York, Pennsylvania, BossTec (Fonda Foster) from Atlanta, Big Lex (Alexius Ray) from South Carolina, Mz Natural (Ariel Robinson) from Gary, Indiana, Chanel Tso (Anaiah Wilson) from Houston and Yummie P (Alexandria Lynn) from Long Beach, California. Blue Face Barbie and Aqua quit the show early into the season, while Joseline rewards one of the girls with the title of a "cabaret captain", first Lucky, then Yummie, and finally Sapphire. Ultimately, Natural, Chanel, Lexi Blow and Lucky are chosen to perform with Joseline in the cabaret, with Chanel winning the $10,000 prize.

Joseline's Cabaret: Las Vegas is set in Las Vegas, Nevada with Chanel and Lexi Blow returning, alongside ten new cast members. They include Jordan Monroe (Jordan Lawrence) from New Jersey, ReRe (Rio Danielle O'Dell), Lollipop (Jeni Pollard) from Denver, Amber Ward from Chicago, Raven Diaz from Miami, BlckDiamond (Amanda) from Kissimmee, Florida, K. Kapri from Atlanta, Henny (Genesis) from New York City, Gaia Love from Tennessee and Ms. Wet Wet from the Bay Area.

Cast duration

Joseline's Cabaret: Miami

Joseline's Cabaret: Atlanta

Joseline's Cabaret: Las Vegas

Note:

Episodes

Joseline's Cabaret: Miami (2020)

Joseline's Cabaret: Auditions (2020)

Joseline's Cabaret: Atlanta (2021)

Joseline's Cabaret: Las Vegas (2022)

References

External links
 

2020s American reality television series
2020 American television series debuts
English-language television shows
Prostitution in American television
Television shows set in Miami
Television shows set in Atlanta
Television shows set in Las Vegas
African-American reality television series
Hip hop television